Jan Cook was the Alabama State Auditor from 1983 to 1991. A Democrat, she was the youngest person to ever be elected as State Auditor in Alabama's history.

References

State Auditors of Alabama
20th-century American politicians
20th-century American women politicians
Alabama Democrats
Women state constitutional officers of Alabama
Year of birth missing (living people)
Living people
21st-century American women